Kevin Ray Hern (born December 4, 1961) is an American businessman and politician from Oklahoma. The chair of the Republican Study Committee, a group of conservative Republicans in the House, Hern was first elected in 2018. In the 2023 Speaker of the House of Representatives election, Hern was nominated for Speaker of the House as a protest candidate against Kevin McCarthy.

Early life and education
Born on an Air Force base in Missouri, Hern moved to Pope County with his mother, Freda Flansburg, and younger brother after his parents separated. He graduated from Dover High School in 1980 and Arkansas Tech University in 1986 before working at Rockwell International while pursuing a PhD in astronautical engineering at the Georgia Institute of Technology. He left his degree program without finishing after the Challenger disaster in 1986.

Hern received his MBA from University of Arkansas, Little Rock, in 1999.

Career

McDonald's franchises
In 1987, Hern moved to Arkansas and went to work for McDonald's; within a few years, he was an operations manager for several McDonald's franchises in the Little Rock area. In January 1997, he bought his first McDonald's, in North Little Rock. He sold that franchise in 1999 to move to Muskogee, Oklahoma, where he bought two franchises. He expanded his business to 18 franchises in the Tulsa, Oklahoma, area. In 2018, during his first campaign for office, The Frontier coined the nickname "McCongressman" for Hern in reference to his McDonald's franchises. The nickname was subsequently picked up by other outlets after his election. He sold his last McDonald's franchise in 2021.

Current businesses
In addition to his restaurant holdings, Hern started a number of other business enterprises in Oklahoma, including a hog farm, a community bank, and several high-school sports publications. In 2019, he owned a company that manufactured decor and furniture for some of the largest U.S. fast-food restaurant companies and had assets worth between $38.7 million and $92.9 million.

U.S. House of Representatives

Elections

2018 

Hern advanced to the runoff, where he defeated Tim Harris. He then advanced to the general election, where he defeated Democratic nominee Tim Gilpin. Outgoing Governor Mary Fallin then appointed Hern to serve the rest of Bridenstine's third term. She was able to do so because under Oklahoma law, if a House seat falls vacant in an even-numbered year and the incumbent's term is due to end the following year, the governor can appoint someone to serve the remainder of the term. Accordingly, Hern was sworn into the House on November 13.

2020 

Hern defeated Democratic nominee Kojo Asamoa-Caesar and Independent Evelyn L. Rogers in the November 2020 general election.

2022 

Hern ran for a third term in 2022, despite speculation that he might run for the open Senate seat being vacated by Jim Inhofe. Hern defeated Democratic nominee Adam Martin and Independent Evelyn L. Rogers in the November general election.

Tenure
During the COVID-19 pandemic, Hern's KTAK Corporation received between $1 million and $2 million in federally backed small business loans from American Bank and Trust as part of the Paycheck Protection Program. KTAK stated it would retain 220 jobs. The loan was seen as notable since Hern is a vocal opponent of deficit spending; in 2018, discussing a balanced budget, he said, "While there is no easy fix to this, the first step is clear: stop adding to it." In 2020, he said, "This isn't a bailout. It's a repayment of what the government has taken away from American workers and businesses." KTAK operates franchises. During the Paycheck Protection Program negotiations, Hern pushed to increase the amount of aid going to franchises.

Hern was ranked number 7 in the United States House of Representatives by total number of stock trades while in office between January 2020 and January 2022 and violated the STOCK Act in 2021.

In December 2020, Hern was one of 126 Republican members of the House of Representatives to sign an amicus brief in support of Texas v. Pennsylvania, a lawsuit filed at the United States Supreme Court contesting the results of the 2020 presidential election, in which Joe Biden prevailed over incumbent Donald Trump. The Supreme Court declined to hear the case on the basis that Texas lacked standing under Article III of the Constitution to challenge the results of an election held by another state.

In July 2021, Hern voted against the bipartisan ALLIES Act, which would increase by 8,000 the number of special immigrant visas for Afghan allies of the U.S. military during its invasion of Afghanistan, while also reducing some application requirements that caused long application backlogs; the bill passed in the House 407–16.

Immigration 
Hern voted against the Further Consolidated Appropriations Act of 2020, which authorizes DHS to nearly double the available H-2B visas for the remainder of FY 2020.

Hern voted against the Consolidated Appropriations Act (H.R. 1158), which effectively prohibits Immigration and Customs Enforcement from cooperating with the Department of Health and Human Services to detain or remove illegal alien sponsors of Unaccompanied Alien Children.

Big Tech 
In 2022, Hern was one of 39 Republicans to vote for the Merger Filing Fee Modernization Act of 2022, an antitrust package that would crack down on corporations for anti-competitive behavior.

2023 Speaker election

On the eighth ballot of the 2023 Speaker of the House of Representatives election, Hern received two votes, from Representative Lauren Boebert and Representative Josh Brecheen. Hern himself voted for Kevin McCarthy. He was officially nominated by Boebert on the ninth ballot and received three votes. He was again nominated by Boebert on the tenth ballot, and received seven votes. On the 11th ballot, Representative Bob Good of Virginia nominated Hern and he received seven votes. After the votes, Hern told The Frontier he was not ruling out a run for the Speakership and he  would "think and pray about [it] before deciding." The next day, Kevin McCarthy secured the votes to win the election.

Committee assignments 

 Committee on Ways and Means (117th Congress)
Subcommittee on Social Security
Subcommittee on Health
Subcommittee on Select Revenue Measures
Subcommittee on Worker and Family Support
Committee on Small Business (116th Congress)
Subcommittee on Economic Growth, Tax and Capital Access (Ranking Member)
Subcommittee on Health and Technology
Committee on Natural Resources (116th Congress)
Subcommittee on Energy and Mineral Resources (Deputy Republican Leader)
Subcommittee on Indigenous Peoples of the United States
Committee on the Budget (116th Congress)

Caucus memberships 

 Republican Study Committee
 Budget and Spending Task Force Chairman (117th Congress)

Political positions

Syria
In 2023, Hern was among 47 Republicans to vote in favor of H.Con.Res. 21 which directed President Joe Biden to remove U.S. troops from Syria within 180 days.

Welfare
Hern has called current welfare spending "tragic". He is a strong supporter of work requirements for welfare programs and credits his support of the Temporary Assistance for Needy Families program to its work requirement.

Electoral history

Personal life
Hern and his wife, Tammy, have three children and two grandchildren. It is his second marriage.

References

External links

Congressman Kevin Hern official U.S. House website
Kevin Hern for Congress official campaign site

|-

|-

1961 births
21st-century American politicians
Arkansas Tech University alumni
Living people
People from Pope County, Arkansas
Politicians from Tulsa, Oklahoma
Republican Party members of the United States House of Representatives from Oklahoma